Kućište or Kučišće (also written "Kučište") is a small village on the southern coast of the Pelješac peninsula in  Dubrovnik-Neretva county (Dubrovačko-neretvanska županija), Croatia. It has a population of 204.

The inhabitants have a long seafaring tradition, the income from which allowed them to build, for the time, the large, affluent, stone mansions characteristic of the area.

Main tourist attractions in Kućište include:
Windsurfing
Hiking (Mt Illya- Sveti Ilija- 961m)
Illyrian artifacts (Nakovane)
Summer sports

The hamlet of Perna is located in a separate cove to the east of Kućište.

See also 
Korčula – 15 min. by ferry across the channel.
Dubrovnik – less than 130 km to the southeast
Viganj – windsurfing village within walking distance to the west
Orebić – 5 km to the east
Split – 2 hours away by hydrofoil from Korčula.

References

External links 
http://www.crosurf.com/
http://www.korcula.net/naselja/ostalo/viganj.htm

Populated places in Dubrovnik-Neretva County